Chapois is a village of Wallonia, part of the district of Leignon in the municipality of Ciney, located in the province of Namur, Belgium.

Chapois is twinned with a village of the same name, Chapois in France.

It is served by its own railway station, on the Namur - Arlon - Luxembourg line. The next station to the north-west is Leignon and the next station to the east is Haversin.

References

Sub-municipalities of Ciney
Populated places in Namur (province)